Godfrey Anderson Rockefeller, Sr. (May 22, 1924 – January 22, 2010) was an American aviator. He was the eldest son of Godfrey Stillman Rockefeller (1899–1983) and Helen Gratz. He is best known for his environmental interests and role in the World Wildlife Fund.

Early life
Godfrey Anderson Rockefeller was born on May 22, 1924, in New York City to Godfrey Stillman Rockefeller (1899–1983) and Helen Gratz. He attended Phillips Academy Andover and later Yale University, at the same time as family friend George H. W. Bush.

Career
He joined the United States Marine Corps and served in both World War II and the Korean War, achieving the rank of Major Aviator Pilot.

He was president and chairman of the Helicopter Association of America, now known as the Helicopter Association International, in 1968, and also belonged to the American Helicopter Society, being a member since 1952 and belonging to its Gold Circle Club.

Rockefeller "played an important role in the founding and creation" of the World Wildlife Fund, which included "hiring the first staff and chief scientist", and later served as its executive director from 1972 to 1978. From 1977 to 2006 he served on the board of directors and the National Council of the WWF.

From 1981 to 1990, he was chairman of the Chesapeake Bay Foundation, and after that chairman emeritus. Rockefeller owned a home on Gibson Island in Maryland and was keenly interested in the preservation of the failing Chesapeake Bay. Following his unexpected death on January 22, 2010, at the St. Andrew's Club in Delray Beach, Florida, where he also owned a home, the Gibson Island community honored him by flying their flag at half-mast.

Personal life
Godfrey's first marriage to Constance Hamilton Wallace ended in divorce. He was then married to Margaret "Margo" Kuhn Rockefeller for fifty three years; she died in 2009, a year before his death. He is survived by four children and several grandchildren.

See also
Rockefeller family

References

1924 births
2010 deaths
Rockefeller family
American people of English descent
American people of German descent
American people of Scotch-Irish descent
Phillips Academy alumni
Yale University alumni
Aviators from New York (state)
United States Marines
United States Marine Corps personnel of World War II
United States Marine Corps personnel of the Korean War
Helicopter pilots
People from Delray Beach, Florida